Vasfi Samimi Visoka (1908 – 1981) was an Albanian footballer, writer, doctor and veterinarian. He was the first Albanian footballer to play competitively abroad, as he was part of the Fenerbahçe side for the 1927–28 campaign. Upon his return to Albania he played for both Sportklub Vlorë and Sportklub Tiranë. He was part of the Sportklub Tiranë squad between 1930 and 1931, but was not a regular member of the team because of his activities outside of football.

Honours
Albanian Superliga: 1
 1931

References

1908 births
1981 deaths
People from Mallakastër
Albanian footballers
Association football goalkeepers
Fenerbahçe S.K. footballers
Flamurtari Vlorë players
KF Tirana players
Kategoria Superiore players
Albanian expatriate footballers
Expatriate footballers in Turkey
Albanian expatriate sportspeople in Turkey
Albanian orientalists
20th-century translators